Sabie is a town in South Africa. It may also refer to
Sabie River in South Africa
Sabie (surname)

See also
Lower Sabie, a camp in the Kruger National Park on the southern bank of the Sabie River